Egor Leonidovich Mekhontsev (Егор Леонидович Мехонцев, transliteration Egor Leonidovich Mechoncev; born 14 November 1984), is a Russian professional boxer, who among other achievements, won gold at 2012 London Olympics in the light heavyweight division.

Career

Light-Heavyweight
Southpaw Mekhontsev won a silver medal in the 2004 Light-heavyweight Russian senior national championships losing to Mikhail Gala in the final and won another silver in 2005 again losing to Gala in the semi-final by 39:26.

The following year in 2006 he won bronze losing to Artur Beterbiyev 41:30 in the semi-final and in 2007 another bronze losing to Evgeni Makarenko.

Change to Heavyweight
Mekhontsev then moved up to the heavyweight 201 lbs limit division and won the 2008 Russian national championships beating Evgeniy Romanov in the final by a score of 19-5.

At the 2008 European Amateur Boxing Championships in Liverpool he defeated Nasi Hani (Macedonia) INJ RND 4, Stephen Simmons (boxer) (Scotland) 14-1, Petrisor Gananau (Romania) 5-2 and won Gold after defeating Armenia's Tsolak Ananikyan 9-2 in the final.

At the 2009 World Amateur Boxing Championships – Heavyweight he upset Clemente Russo and beat fellow southpaws Oleksandr Usyk in the semifinal and Osmay Acosta in the final.

Mekhontsev successfully defended his title at the 2010 European Amateur Boxing Championships against Denis Poyatsika and Tervel Pulev.

Change to Light-Heavyweight
For the 2011 World Amateur Boxing Championships he traded weightclasses with Beterbiyev and dropped to light heavy. He beat Marcus Browne and Oleksandr Hvozdyk but was upset by young Cuban Julio César la Cruz and won Bronze.

At the 2012 Olympics, being 28 years of age, he beat Damien Hooper, Elshod Rasulov, Yamaguchi Falcao in the semifinals and won Gold by defeating Adilbek Niyazymbetov.

Turning professional
Mekhontsev turned professional in October 2013, signing with boxing promotion company Top Rank, which has also signed up a number of other 2012 olympic medallists.

Mekhontsev made his professional debut on December 7, 2013, dominating and knocking down opponent PJ Cajagas three times before the referee stopped the contest in the third round.

Professional boxing record

|-  style="text-align:center; background:#e3e3e3;"
|  style="border-style:none none solid solid; "|Res.
|  style="border-style:none none solid solid; "|Record
|  style="border-style:none none solid solid; "|Opponent
|  style="border-style:none none solid solid; "|Type
|  style="border-style:none none solid solid; "|Round
|  style="border-style:none none solid solid; "|Date
|  style="border-style:none none solid solid; "|Location
|  style="border-style:none none solid solid; "|Notes
|- align=center
|Win
|13-0-1
|align=left| Gusmyr Perdomo
|
| 
|
|align=left|
|align=left|
|- align=center
|Draw
|12-0-1
|align=left| Alexander Johnson
|
| 
|
|align=left|
|align=left|
|- align=center
|Win
|12-0-0
|align=left| Victor Barragan
|
| 
|
|align=left|
|align=left|
|- align=center
|Win
|11-0-0
|align=left| Felipe Romero
|||
|
|align=left|
|align=left|
|- align=center
|Win
|10-0-0
|align=left| Jackson Junior
|||
|
|align=left|
|align=left|
|- align=center
|Win
|9-0-0
|align=left| Hakim Zoulikha
|||
|
|align=left|
|align=left|
|- align=center
|Win
|8-0-0
|align=left| Marcelo Leandro Da Silva
||| 
|
|align=left|
|align=left|
|- align=center
|Win
|7-0-0
|align=left| Joey Vegas
|||
|
|align=left|
|align=left|
|- align=center
|Win
|6-0-0
|align=left| Jinner Guerrero
|||
|
|align=left|
|align=left|
|- align=center
|Win
|5-0-0
|align=left| Samuel Miller
|||
|
|align=left|
|align=left|
|- align=center
|Win
|4-0-0
|align=left| Mike Mirafuente
|||
|
|align=left|
|align=left|
|- align=center
|Win
|3-0-0
|align=left| Dwayne Williams
|||
|
|align=left|
|align=left|
|- align=center
|Win
|2-0-0
|align=left| Atthaporn Jaritram
|||
|
|align=left|
|align=left|
|- align=center
|Win
|1–0-0
|align=left| PJ Cajigas
|||
|
|align=left|
|align=left|

References

1984 births
Living people
Light-heavyweight boxers
Heavyweight boxers
Boxers at the 2012 Summer Olympics
Olympic boxers of Russia
Olympic gold medalists for Russia
Olympic medalists in boxing
Medalists at the 2012 Summer Olympics
Russian male boxers
AIBA World Boxing Championships medalists
People from Asbest
Sportspeople from Sverdlovsk Oblast